Louis-Joseph Janvier (May 7, 1855 - 24 March 1911) was a Haitian journalist, diplomat and novelist.

Born in Port-au-Prince, Janvier attended medical school in Haiti. He then moved to France to finish his education, and received a doctorate in medicine there in 1881. He also earned a law license and degrees in administration, economics, finance, and diplomacy.

While in Paris, Janvier became interested in journalism and wrote several articles, such as "La République d'Haïti et ses Visiteurs", "Haïti aux Haïtiens", and "L'Egalité des Races." He also wrote several novels about Haitian life.

He served as Haitian Minister Resident in London from 1894–1903.

He remained in Europe for twenty-eight years, returning to Haiti once before dying in Paris at age fifty-five.

Selected works 

 "La République d'Haïti et ses Visiteurs" (1883) - article, 
 "L'Egalité des Races" (1884) - article, 
 "Haïti aux Haïtiens" (1884) - article, 
 "Les Affaires d'Haiti" (1885) - historical article
 Les Constitutions d'Haïti (1886) - 
 Le Vieux Piquet (1888) - novel
 Une Chercheuse (1889) - novel
 Elections Legislatives de 1908 (1908) in the Digital Library of the Caribbean

References
 

1855 births
1911 deaths
Haitian journalists
19th-century Haitian novelists
Haitian male novelists
People from Port-au-Prince
19th-century male writers